Bienotheroides is an extinct genus of tritylodontid mammaliamorphs from the Jurassic of China and Mongolia. The genus contains five species, primarily known from cranial remains.

References

Tritylodontids
Prehistoric cynodont genera
Middle Jurassic synapsids of Asia
Late Jurassic synapsids of Asia
Jurassic China
Fossils of China
Fossil taxa described in 1982
Taxa named by Yang Zhongjian